Solfa may refer to:
 Solfège, a pedagogical solmization technique for the teaching of sight-singing
 Trade name for Amlexanox, a pharmaceutical drug

See also
  Solva (disambiguation)